Henry Briton Kerby (11 December 1914 – 4 January 1971) was a British Conservative Member of Parliament for Arundel and Shoreham.  He won the seat in a 1954 by-election, and served until his death at the age of 56 in Chichester in 1971. For a time he was associated with the National Fellowship group.

Before joining the Conservative Party, Kerby was a Liberal politician. He contested Spelthorne at the 1945 general election as a Liberal and Swansea West at the 1951 general election as a Conservative.

After he died, his seat was successfully retained by the Conservative candidate, Richard Luce.

References

External links 
 

1914 births
1971 deaths
Conservative Party (UK) MPs for English constituencies
UK MPs 1951–1955
UK MPs 1955–1959
UK MPs 1959–1964
UK MPs 1964–1966
UK MPs 1966–1970
UK MPs 1970–1974